The 2018 Gimcheon Open ATP Challenger was a professional tennis tournament played on hard courts. It was the fifth edition of the tournament which was part of the 2018 ATP Challenger Tour. It took place in Gimcheon, Korea between 7 and 13 May 2018.

Singles main-draw entrants

Seeds

 1 Rankings are as of 30 April 2018.

Other entrants
The following players received wildcards into the singles main draw:
  Chung Yun-seong
  Lee Duck-hee
  Lee Young-seok
  Park Ui-sung

The following players received entry from the qualifying draw:
  Yoshihito Nishioka
  Makoto Ochi
  Renta Tokuda
  Wishaya Trongcharoenchaikul

The following player received entry as a lucky loser:
  Luke Saville

Champions

Singles

  Yoshihito Nishioka def.  Vasek Pospisil 6–4, 7–5.

Doubles

  Ruan Roelofse /  John-Patrick Smith def.  Sanchai Ratiwatana /  Sonchat Ratiwatana 6–2, 6–3.

References

2018 ATP Challenger Tour
2018
2018 in South Korean tennis